Alexandra Fisher (born 3 June 1988, in Pavlodar) is a Kazakhstani athlete. She competed for Kazakhstan in shot put at the 2012 Summer Olympics.

References

Kazakhstani female shot putters
Athletes (track and field) at the 2012 Summer Olympics
Olympic athletes of Kazakhstan
1988 births
Living people
People from Pavlodar